Al-Hasan Ali Al-Yami (born 21 August 1972) is a Saudi Arabian professional footballer who played as a striker for Najran SC and Al Ittihad.

He featured in the Football World Cup 2002 and was part of the infamous team that was beaten 8-0 in a group match against Germany. Most of his career has been played at the Saudi Arabian football club Al Ittihad.

Club career
Al-Ittihad management offered him 250,000 to move to Jeddah and play for Al-Ittihad, then in 2005 he came back to Najran.

International career
He played for the Saudi Arabia national team during the 2002 gulf tournament and was a very effective member. He scored three goals during that tournament.

Club Career Stats

References

Living people
Saudi Arabian footballers
Saudi Arabia international footballers
Ittihad FC players
2002 FIFA World Cup players
1972 births
Najran SC players
Association football forwards
Saudi First Division League players
Saudi Professional League players
Saudi Arabian football managers
Najran SC managers
Saudi Professional League managers